Keith Goullet (22 September 1932 – 5 January 2022) was an Australian rules footballer who played with North Melbourne in the Victorian Football League (VFL). Goullet died on 5 January 2022, at the age of 89.

Notes

External links 

1932 births
2022 deaths
Australian rules footballers from Victoria (Australia)
North Melbourne Football Club players